Wildcat Creek is a stream in Gentry and Nodaway Counties in northwestern Missouri. It is a tributary of the Grand River.

The stream flows to the south and southeast passing under US Route 136 3.5 miles east of Conception where it turns to the east and enters Gentry County. The stream passes south of Stanberry and under US Route 169.

According to tradition, Wildcat Creek was named for a settler who was fond of eating wildcat meat.

See also
List of rivers of Missouri

References

Rivers of Gentry County, Missouri
Rivers of Nodaway County, Missouri
Rivers of Missouri